Munds Park is an unincorporated census-designated place (CDP) in Coconino County, Arizona, United States. The year round population was 631 at the 2010 census.

Geography

Climate
According to the Köppen Climate Classification system, Sunset Crater has a Continental climate, abbreviated "Dsa" on climate maps.

Demographics

As of the census of 2000, there were 1,250 people, 583 households, and 378 families residing in the CDP. The racial makeup of the CDP was 95.9% White, 0.3% Black or African American, 0.8% Native American, 0.2% Asian, 1.2% from other races, and 1.5% from two or more races. Hispanic or Latino of any race were 5.7% of the population.

There were 583 households, out of which 16.3% had children under the age of 18 living with them, 60.2% were married couples living together, 2.9% had a female householder with no husband present, and 35.0% were non-families. 26.2% of all households were made up of individuals, and 9.9% had someone living alone who was 65 years of age or older.  The average household size was 2.14 and the average family size was 2.58.

In the CDP, the age distribution of the population shows 15.5% under the age of 18, 4.3% from 18 to 24, 21.3% from 25 to 44, 36.1% from 45 to 64, and 22.8% who were 65 years of age or older.  The median age was 50 years. For every 100 females, there were 100.6 males.  For every 100 females age 18 and over, there were 102.3 males.

The median income for a household in the CDP was $41,432, and the median income for a family was $49,803. Males had a median income of $40,558 versus $22,200 for females. The per capita income for the CDP was $22,769.  About 4.4% of families and 7.9% of the population were below the poverty line, including 10.4% of those under age 18 and none of those age 65 or over.

Community

Munds Park is widely regarded for its variety of outdoor recreation opportunities in all seasons. The Munds Park Trail System is a collection of trails surrounding the town designated for hiking, mountain biking, and ATVs. It is an extremely popular summer destination for off-road and All-Terrain Vehicles. The Arizona Trail passes between Munds Park and Mormon Lake. At large camping is allowed in the adjacent Coconino National Forest for portions of the year.

Several lakes can be found in the area. Located directly in Munds Park is Lake O'Dell, a small lake created by an earthen dam on Munds Creek. Lake O’Dell is popular among kayakers and local fishermen. It is a haven for both migratory and non-migratory bird species, including ospreys and bald eagles. Other nearby lakes used for outdoor recreation include Lake Mary and Mormon Lake, Arizona's largest natural lake, along with dozens of springs and natural ponds known as tanks.

Munds Park is located within Arizona Hunting Unit 6A, and is among the richest units for elk, deer, and other large game in the United States. 6A is heavily forested and is crossed by dozens of dirt roads. Also located in Munds Park is Pinewood Country Club, a private 18-hole championship golf course.

The official paper of Munds Park since 1993 is the Pinewood News. The paper notes events, history and local news. www.ThePinewoodNews.com.

Pinewood Country Club
Munds Park is home of the Pinewood Country Club, an 18-hole championship golf course. It is normally open from about Memorial Day through October. The clubhouse was constructed in the late 1950s and is home to two dining/event rooms, a restaurant, and a bar, plus it has a patio for outdoor seating. The club features a large driving range, chipping green, and putting green. The country club has a lightning warning system.

References

Census-designated places in Coconino County, Arizona